Clara Tauson was the defending champion but chose not to participate.

Greet Minnen won the title, defeating Daria Snigur in the final, 6–4, 6–3.

Seeds

Draw

Finals

Top half

Bottom half

References

Main Draw

Burg-Wächter Ladies Open - Singles